A coved ceiling is a ceiling that has had the visual appearance of the point where the ceiling meets the walls improved by the addition of coving.
It can also refer to a ceiling, like in a Mosque.

References 

Interior design